Senathipathi is a 1996 Tamil language drama film directed by M. Rathnakumar, and also the script writer for films like Kizhakku Cheemayile (1993) and Karuthamma (1994). The film stars Sathyaraj in dual roles, along with Soundarya and Sukanya. It was released on 10 November 1996. It was a commercial success.

Plot

Senathipathi Thevar is a rich and respected village man who is married to Meenakshi, while his little brother Sethupathi is a good-for-nothing young man. Senathipathi Thevar and Lingappan Naicker , another rich respected village man and their area chief, are best friends. Senathipathi has been charged for past 10 years with the duty to protect the village against the robbers, which he has done with 100% efficiency. Lingappan Naicker's daughter Aishwarya, a clever, beautiful and arrogant girl, returns after studying in the city. Sethupathi and Aishwarya eventually fall in love with each other. But, Lingappan Naicker is totally against inter-caste marriage and sees them together. Nagappa Naickar is a long-distant relative of Lingappa and head of their rival village. Though he is rich, Nagappa Naickar has very bad habits and so does his only son. Lingappa's and Nagappa's villages clash every year, to receive water from the canal during farming seasons, though justice is on Lingappan Naicker's village. After failing to get water for the past 10 years, Nagappa Naickar gets the photos of Sethu and Aishwarya clubbing each other. he sends the photo to all of his caste's big heads so that none would wed Aishwarya. then, Nagappa Naickar can make his son marry her and get all properties of Lingappa's to himself, including canal's check-dams owned by him.

Meanwhile, to protect Aishwarya, Lingappan Naicker cleverly assigns her to live in Senathipathi's house till her marriage, so that she would be a guarded-object of Senathipathi Thevar so that his brother would be away from her. Sethu and Aishwarya try to break up, but can't. Aishwarya blackmails Sethu to marry her the next day or she will commit suicide. The next day, at the moment of marriage, Senathipathi intercepts Sethu. he asks Sethu to either surrender Aishwarya or comes to a one-on-one till death. Sethu surrenders Aishwarya and is expelled from the house. All of this is seen by Lingappan Naicker afar. he tries to get an alliance to Aishwarya but fails. Then, Nagappa proposes an alliance, and it is taken by Lingappan Naicker. Sethupathi hands over Aishwarya and thus keeps his honour. Then, Aishwarya and her mom plead for Lingappan Naicker to change his mind. When he is about to, Nagappa Naickar and his son come and drag Aiswarya out to be wed. Lingappa shoots both of them dead and starts to find Sethupathi. But, meanwhile, Senathipathi and his wife are attacked on the way home. Though Sethupathi joins them, a traitor stabs both Senathipathi and his wife in the back. At the dying moments, Senathipathi consents for marriage and he removes the thali from his dead wife's neck and gives it to Sethupathi. Sethu then marries Aishwarya there. After a few days, it is seen that Sethupathi is the new Chief of village guards.

Cast

Sathyaraj as Senathipathy Thevar and Sethupathy
Soundarya as Aishwarya
Sukanya as Meenakshi
Goundamani as Kathavarayan
Senthil as Veera Bahu
Vijayakumar as Lingappan Nayakar
Srividya as Lingappan Nayakar's wife
Manivannan as Nagappan
Ponvannan as Nagappan's son
Periya Karuppu Thevar as Meenakshi's father
Mohan V. Ram as Rangachari
Pasi Narayanan as Thavasi
Ponnambalam
Mahanadi Shankar
Thyagu
K. K. Soundar
Oru Viral Krishna Rao
MRK
Dhanapal
MLA Malaya
Bayilvan Ranganathan
MLA Thangaraj
Mahendran
Viswanath
Chandrasekhar as Suruli (guest appearance)

Soundtrack

The film score and the soundtrack were composed by Deva. The soundtrack, released in 1996, features 5 tracks with lyrics written by Vairamuthu and M. Rathnakumar.

Release
Ratnakumar later worked on a project titled Enna Solla Pogirai featuring debutants Nandha, Saikiran and Gayathri Raguram in 2001, but the film was later stalled.

References

1996 films
Films scored by Deva (composer)
1990s Tamil-language films